Ko Lu Pyo is a 2016 Burmese comedy television series. It aired on MRTV-4, from 7 July to 29 September  2016, on Mondays to Fridays at 19:00 for 60 episodes.

Cast

Main cast
Phone Sett Thwin as Shwe Sar
May Mi Ko Ko as Thu La Wun
May Akari Htoo as Kar Yan Cho
Shwe Sin Wint Shein as May Inzali
Kyaw Htoo as Myo Myint Aye
Pwint as Baby Nu

Guest cast
Hein Htet as Hein Htet
Shin Mway La as Shin Mway La
Thar Htet Nyan Zaw as Thar Htet Nyan Zaw

References

Burmese television series
MRTV (TV network) original programming